Tien Tran, Hanh Tien Tran, is an American comedian, actress, and writer. She is best known for her role as Ellen in the comedy series How I Met Your Father (2022–present).

Early life 
Tran was born in Chester, Pennsylvania and grew up in Erie and Millcreek Township. Her parents are Vietnamese refugees who immigrated to the United States in 1979. She graduated from Boston College with a degree in biology, where she was part of a sketch comedy group.

Career 
In 2017, she was a cast member at The Second City in Chicago, where she had previously been a recipient of the Second City's Bob Curry Fellowship.

During 2017–2020, she appeared in guest roles in several TV series, including Easy, Hot Date, Sherman's Showcase, and Space Force. In 2021, she was a staff writer for the second season of Work in Progress, and co-wrote and appeared in one episode. She also appeared in the Chicago-set horror film Candyman and an episode of the comedy series South Side.

In 2021, Tran was cast as a series regular in the Hulu sitcom How I Met Your Father, a spin-off of the series How I Met Your Mother. She plays Ellen, who moves to New York from a small farming town in Iowa after divorcing her wife. The series was released on January 18, 2022. On February 15, 2022, Hulu renewed the series for a 20-episode second season.

Filmography

Film

Television

Personal life 
Tran is openly lesbian. Tran's older sister Tram-Anh Tran starred in the 1990s children's television series Ghostwriter.

References

External links 

 Tien Tran at IMDb

American television actresses
American women comedians
Actresses from Pennsylvania
21st-century American actresses
21st-century American comedians
American people of Vietnamese descent
Living people
Morrissey College of Arts & Sciences alumni
Comedians from Pennsylvania
American LGBT people of Asian descent
American lesbian writers
American lesbian actresses
Lesbian comedians
LGBT people from Pennsylvania
Year of birth missing (living people)
American LGBT comedians